The 2016–17 Inverness Caledonian Thistle F.C. season is the club's fourth season in the Scottish Premiership and their seventh consecutive season in the top division of Scottish football. Caley Thistle also competed in the Scottish League Cup and the Scottish Cup.

Summary

Season
Caley Thistle finished twelfth in the Scottish Premiership and were automatically relegated to the Scottish Championship. They reached the second round of the Scottish League Cup, the fifth round of the Scottish Cup.

Management
Caley Thistle were managed by Richie Foran, during the 2016–17 season. John Hughes departed the club during the close season on 20 May 2016, having negotiated his exit with the board. Hughes had previously raised concerns with the club's budget for 2016–17.  On 30 May 2016, Foran was appointed manager on a four-year contract, marking his retirement as a player. Brian Rice remained as assistant manager.

Results and fixtures

Friendlies

Scottish Premiership

League Cup

Scottish Cup

Squad statistics
During the 2016–17 season, Inverness Caledonian Thistle have used twenty-nine different players in competitive games. The table below shows the number of appearances and goals scored by each player.

Appearances

|}

Overall goalscorers

Hat-tricks

Team statistics

League table

Results by matchday

Management statistics
Last updated on 20 May 2017

Transfers 

* - At time of signing

See also
 List of Inverness Caledonian Thistle F.C. seasons

Notes

References

External links
 

Inverness Caledonian Thistle F.C. seasons
Inverness